Atmakur or Athmakur may refer to:

Places

Andhra Pradesh 

 Atmakur, Anantapur district, a village in the state of Andhra Pradesh
 Atmakur, Durgi, Guntur district, a village in Durgi mandal, Guntur district, Andhra Pradesh, India
 Atmakur, Kurnool district, a town in the Indian state of Andhra Pradesh
 Atmakur, Nellore district, a city in the state of Andhra Pradesh
 Atmakur, Mangalagiri, Guntur district, a Village in Mangalagiri mandal, Andhra Pradesh

Telangana 
 Atmakur, Medak district, a village in the Indian state of Telangana
 Atmakur (M), Yadadri Bhuvanagiri district, a village in the state of Telangana
 Atmakur, Wanaparthy, a town in the state of Telangana
 Atmakur, Warangal (rural) district, a village in the state of Telangana

Politics 
 Atmakur (Assembly constituency), an assembly constituency of Nellore district in Andhra Pradesh, India.